Hot Summer in Barefoot County is a 1974 comedy film directed by Will Zens and produced & distributed by Preacherman Corporation. The plot involves an undercover agent who is sent to a small southern town in order to uncover an underground moon-shining ring, but when he finds out that the town is filled with voluptuous women ready to satisfy his every need, things start to get confusing.

See also
 List of American films of 1974

External links

 
 
  
 Hot Summer in Barefoot County – at the Troma Entertainment movie database

1974 films
1974 independent films
American independent films
Troma Entertainment films
1970s comedy thriller films
American comedy thriller films
Films directed by Will Zens
1974 comedy films
1970s English-language films
1970s American films